Pradoxa is a genus of sea snails, marine gastropod mollusks in the subfamily Muricopsinae  of the family Muricidae, the murex snails or rock snails.

Species
Species within the genus Pradoxa include:
 Pradoxa confirmata (Fernandes & Rolán, 1990)
 Pradoxa gorii Houart & Rolán, 2012
 Pradoxa thomensis (Fernandes & Rolan, 1990)
 Pradoxa urdambideli Houart & Rolán, 2012

References

 Fernandes F. & Rolán E. 1990. Nuevo género y nuevas especies de la familia Buccinidae Rafinesque, 1815 (Mollusca, Neogastropoda) en la isla de São Tomé. Bollettino Malacologico, 25: 9-12.
 Fernandes F. & Rolán E. (1993) Pradoxa nomen novum para Paradoxon Fernandes & Rolán, 1990. Iberus 11(1): 61.
 Houart R. & Rolán E. 2012. The genus Pradoxa Fernandes & Rolán, 1993 (Gastropoda: Muricidae) in São Tomé, Príncipe and Annobón. Iberus, 30(1): 1-14

Muricopsinae